The 2023 season of Papua New Guinea National Rugby League competition will be the 33rd  season of the premier rugby league competition in Papua New Guinea since 1991.

Teams 

The competition will still have 12 franchise teams competing in 2022 with the inclusion of successful bid team, Sepik Pride at the expense of Waghi Tumbe who were terminated for breaching the participation agreement in 2022.

Regular season

Ladder 

 The team highlighted in blue has clinched the minor premiership
 Teams highlighted in green have qualified for the finals
 The team highlighted in red has clinched the wooden spoon

Finals series

References

Papua New Guinea National Rugby League
2023 in Papua New Guinea rugby league